Sruffaunoughterluggatoora is a stream in County Galway in Ireland. It is located in the townland of Glencoaghanin the civil parish of Moyrus, and barony of Ballynahinch. It is amongst the longest place names (in English) in the country with 25 letters.

References

Rivers of County Galway